The Bishop of Ripon is an episcopal title which takes its name after the city of Ripon in North Yorkshire, England. The bishop is one of the area bishops of the Diocese of Leeds in the Province of York. The area bishop of Ripon has oversight of the archdeaconry of Richmond and Craven, which consists of the deaneries of Bowland, Ewecross, Harrogate, Richmond, Ripon, Skipton, and Wensley.

The current title Bishop of Ripon is renamed from Bishop of Knaresborough, which was an episcopal title used by a suffragan bishop of the Church of England Dioceses of Ripon (later Ripon and Leeds) and then of Leeds, in the Province of York, England. The title took its name after the historic market and spa town of Knaresborough in North Yorkshire.

The Diocese of Ripon and Leeds was dissolved on 20 April 2014 and its former territory was added to the new Diocese of Leeds. The first Area Bishop of Ripon was James Bell, who had previously been the suffragan Bishop of Knaresborough and area bishop in Ripon, and was acting diocesan Bishop of Ripon and Leeds until the dissolution of that diocese.

Following the creation of the Diocese of Leeds on 20 April 2014, the see of Knaresborough was eventually renamed to become the suffragan see for the area Bishop of Ripon. To that end the General Synod approved a petition from the Bishop of Leeds in February 2015; that petition was approved by the Queen-in-Council on 19 March 2015 and so the see was translated to Ripon.

James Bell continued in the same See, becoming the area Bishop of Ripon. On 9 November 2017, it was announced that Helen-Ann Hartley, Bishop of Waikato (in Anglican Church in Aotearoa, New Zealand and Polynesia) was to become the next Bishop of Ripon and she was installed on 4 February 2018. On 3 February 2023, Hartley was translated to Newcastle.

List of bishops

References

External links
 Crockford's Clerical Directory - Listings

Ripon
 
Diocese of Ripon and Leeds
Diocese of Ripon
Anglican suffragan bishops in the Diocese of Ripon and Leeds
Lists of English people